Edna Meade Colson (October 7, 1888 – January 17, 1985) was an American educator, known for her contributions to improving access to education to Virginian African Americans.

Biography
Edna Meade Colson was born on October 7, 1888, in Petersburg, Virginia. She was the oldest of five children of prominent educators, James Major Colson and Kate Deaver Hill Colson.

She received her B.A. from Fisk University in 1915 and received a Ph.D. from Teachers College, Columbia University in 1940.

After overcoming her own obstacles to higher education, she became a champion of making graduate education available to African Americans. In 1937 Colson chaired the committee to implement the program offering graduate courses to African Americans at Virginia State University.

Colson was also politically active beyond education. She was among the first women to register to vote after the ratification of the 19th Amendment, and she was the first African-American woman to become a lifetime member of the National Association for the Advancement of Colored People.

Colson lived with her partner Amaza Lee Meredith. They occupied the house in Chesterfield County, Virginia, named "Azurest South", which was designed by Meredith.

Colson retired from Virginia State University (then Virginia State College) in 1953. She died at the age of 96 in a Colonial Heights nursing home on January 17, 1985, and was buried at Eastview Cemetery, Petersburg City, Virginia.

References

Further reading
Fairclough, Adam. A Class of Their Own: Black Teachers in the Segregated South. Cambridge, Massachusetts; London, England: Harvard University Press, 2007. 

African-American educators
Virginia State University faculty
1985 deaths
1888 births
People from Petersburg, Virginia
Educators from Virginia
LGBT people from Virginia
LGBT African Americans
American women academics
20th-century African-American people
20th-century African-American women